Ecuador currently doesn't use DST.

President Sixto Durán Ballén imposed daylight saving time in an energy-saving effort. It lasted from November 28, 1992 to February 5, 1993, encompassing most of the southern hemisphere summer. It was poorly received by the populace and did not last long.

References

See also
 Daylight saving time by country

Time in Ecuador
Ecuador